is the 13th single by Japanese idol duo Wink. Written by Neko Oikawa and Yuki Kadokura, the single was released on December 16, 1991, by Polystar Records.

Background and release 
Both "Tsuioku no Heroine" and the B-side "Image na Kankei" were recorded as the ending and opening themes, respectively, of the NTV anime series .

"Tsuioku no Heroine" peaked at No. 5 on the Oricon's weekly charts and sold over 136,000 copies.

Track listing 
All lyrics are written by Neko Oikawa; all music is arranged by Satoshi Kadokura.

Chart positions 
Weekly charts

Year-end charts

References

External links 
 

1991 singles
1991 songs
Wink (duo) songs
Japanese-language songs
Songs with lyrics by Neko Oikawa
Anime songs